is a scientific journal, which was founded in 1926 by the Chemical Society of Japan. It publishes accounts, articles, and short articles in the fields of theoretical and physical chemistry, analytical and inorganic chemistry, organic and biological chemistry, and applied and materials chemistry.

Due to World War II publication was suspended between 1945 and 1946. It is published in both a print edition and an online edition.

External links
 Homepage of the Chemical Society of Japan

References

Chemistry journals
Publications established in 1926
Academic journals published by learned and professional societies
Chemical Society of Japan